Waldyr Pereira, also known as Didi (8 October 1928 – 12 May 2001), was a Brazilian footballer who played as a midfielder or as a forward. He played in three FIFA World Cups (1954, 1958, and 1962), winning the latter two.

Considered as an elegant and technical player, Didi was renowned for his range of passing, stamina and technique. He also was a free-kick specialist, being famous for inventing the folha seca (dry leaf) dead ball free kicks, notably used by modern-day players such as Juninho and Cristiano Ronaldo, where the ball would swerve downward unexpectedly at a point resulting in a goal.

During his career, he was part of Fluminense FC between the end of the 1940s to the mid-1950s and one of the main players of the iconic squad of Botafogo FR in the early 1960s with other world champions such as Garrincha, Nilton Santos, Zagallo and Amarildo.

Early life
Didi was born into a poor family in the city of Campos dos Goytacazes, 150 miles north of Rio de Janeiro. As a youngster, he sold peanuts in order to help his family, and began playing football in the streets  and nearly had his right leg amputated when he was 14 due to a severe infection following an injury to his knee. He later recovered and played for local clubs in his hometown.

Playing career

He became professional playing for Madureira and came to prominence when he joined Fluminense in 1949. At Fluminense, Didi played between 1949 and 1956, the club for which he played the longest time without interruption, having played 298 matches and scored 91 goals, being one of the main responsible for winning the  1951 Carioca Championship, in addition to scoring the first goal in the history of Maracanã for the Carioca Selection in 1950, defending his childhood club, and leading the Brazil National team in winning the 1952 Panamerican Championship, disputed in Chile, in the first relevant achievement of the Brazil national team abroad, having played alongside Djalma Santos,  Castilho,  Waldo, Telê Santana, Orlando Pingo de Ouro,  Altair and  Pinheiro, among others. During seven seasons with the club he won the Campeonato carioca in 1951 and 1952 Copa Rio.  On 16 June 1950, in a friendly match involving Rio de Janeiro and São Paulo youth state teams, Didi (aged 21), playing for Rio de Janeiro, scored the first ever goal at the Maracanã Stadium.

During the 1954 World Cup he scored goals against Mexico and Yugoslavia, before Brazil's defeat to the favorites Hungary. This match was known as the Battle of Berne; Didi was involved with the brawl that followed this bad-tempered match.

At club level, he moved to Botafogo, winning the Campeonato Carioca (Rio state championship) in 1957. Didi had previously promised to walk from the Maracanã to his house, in the neighbourhood of Laranjeiras (9,4 km), in his kit, if Botafogo won the championship; 5,000 Botafogo fans joined him as he did so.

His greatest achievement came at the 1958 FIFA World Cup where he was player of the tournament. From midfield, he masterminded the first of his two FIFA World Cup successes for Brazil. In 68 international matches he scored 20 goals, including a dozen using his trademark free-kicks.

In 1959 he was signed by Real Madrid of Spain, playing alongside many historical players such as Ferenc Puskás, Alfredo Di Stefano and Francisco Gento. 
Despite his great reputation after the 1958 FIFA World Cup, he played only 19 matches with 6 goals for the Spaniards and often clashed with the team leader Alfredo Di Stéfano, who felt offended by the divide in the fans' attention with this newcomer; this situation precipitated his exit from the club. Nevertheless, despite his brief stint as a player for Real Madrid, he was able to participate in the victorious campaign of 1959–60 European Cup.

After Real Madrid he came back to Botafogo being part one of the most successful Brazilian teams at club level of all times. The Botafogo in the early 60s with the well-known Garrincha, Nilton Santos, Zagallo, Amarildo, Quarentinha and the very promising youngsters such as Manga, Gérson, Rildo and Jairzinho. At the time, Botafogo was the only club in national level able to compete against the Santos of Pelé. 

After almost three successful years with Botafogo, he signed with Sporting Cristal from Peru in 1963, and returning once again for Botafogo FR for the last time in 1964. Botafogo was the club for which Didi played the most matches: he played 313 games and scored 114 goals. He was Rio champion for the club in 1957, 1961 and 1962 and also won the 1962 Rio-São Paulo Tournament, the same year he won the Pentagonal of Mexico and, in 1963, the Paris Tournament.

In 1965 he moved to the Mexican league to play for C.D. Veracruz. In 1966, at the age of 38, he signed with São Paulo Futebol Clube expecting to lead the team with his experience, but he played only four games. After that, he decided to become a coach and retired as a player.

Managerial career 

After retiring as player he began a coach career with Sporting Cristal, and was called to manage the Peru national team in the 1970 FIFA World Cup, successfully guided the Peruvians qualifying at the expense of Argentina, repaying the debt for eliminating Peru from 1958 FIFA World Cup. That team included stars like Teófilo Cubillas and Héctor Chumpitaz were eventually defeated in the quarter finals by Brazil. In 1971, he managed the top Argentine club, River Plate, when he accepted a lucrative position, and had his apex in his coaching career with Turkish Giant Fenerbahçe, guiding the team to two consecutive Turkish First Division (later named Süper Lig) titles in 1973–1974 and later in 1974–1975.

He also coached important Brazilian clubs like Bangu, Fluminense, Botafogo, Cruzeiro, Peruvian club Alianza Lima, Kuwaiti national team and Al-Ahli teams.

Later years
In October 2000, he was inducted into the FIFA Hall of Champions. By this time he was quite ill and died the following year in Rio de Janeiro, at the age of 72, after contracting pneumonia from complications arising from intestinal cancer.

Honours

Player

International
Brazil
 FIFA World Cup: 1958, 1962
 Copa Oswaldo Cruz: 1955, 1958, 1961, 1962
 O'Higgins Cup: 1955, 1961
 Pan American Games: 1952
 Atlantic Cup: 1956

Club
Botafogo
 Campeonato Carioca: 1957, 1961, 1962
 Torneio Rio – São Paulo: 1962
 Tournament Home: 1961, 1962, 1963
 Colombia International Tournament: 1960
 Pentagonal Club of Mexico: 1962

Fluminense
 Copa Rio: 1952
 State Championship: 1951

Real Madrid
 European Cup: 1960
 Ramon de Carranza Trophy: 1959

Individual

FIFA World Cup All-Star Team: 1958
IFFHS Brazilian Player of the 20th Century (7th place)
IFFHS World Player of the 20th Century (19th place)
The Best of The Best – Player of the Century: Top 50
Brazilian Football Museum Hall of Fame
Ballon d'Or Dream Team (Bronze): 2020
IFFHS South America Men's Team of All Time: 2021

References

External links

1928 births
2001 deaths
1954 FIFA World Cup players
1958 FIFA World Cup players
1962 FIFA World Cup players
1970 FIFA World Cup managers
Afro-Brazilian sportspeople
Al-Ahli Saudi FC managers
Al Shabab FC (Riyadh) managers
Club Alianza Lima managers
Association football inside forwards
Association football midfielders
Bangu Atlético Clube managers
Botafogo de Futebol e Regatas managers
Botafogo de Futebol e Regatas players
Brazil international footballers
Brazilian expatriate football managers
Brazilian expatriate footballers
Brazilian expatriate sportspeople in Argentina
Brazilian expatriate sportspeople in Mexico
Brazilian expatriate sportspeople in Peru
Brazilian expatriate sportspeople in Saudi Arabia
Brazilian expatriate sportspeople in Spain
Brazilian expatriate sportspeople in Turkey
Brazilian football managers
Brazilian footballers
Cruzeiro Esporte Clube managers
Deaths from pneumonia in Rio de Janeiro (state)
Expatriate football managers in Argentina
Expatriate football managers in Peru
Expatriate football managers in Saudi Arabia
Expatriate football managers in Turkey
Expatriate footballers in Mexico
Expatriate footballers in Peru
Expatriate footballers in Spain
Fenerbahçe football managers
FIFA World Cup-winning players
Fluminense FC managers
Fluminense FC players
Footballers at the 1952 Summer Olympics
Fortaleza Esporte Clube managers
La Liga players
Liga MX players
Madureira Esporte Clube players
Olympic footballers of Brazil
People from Campos dos Goytacazes
Peru national football team managers
Real Madrid CF players
Club Atlético River Plate managers
São Paulo FC managers
São Paulo FC players
Saudi Professional League managers
Sporting Cristal footballers
Sporting Cristal managers
Sportspeople from Rio de Janeiro (state)
C.D. Veracruz footballers